Leezen is a municipality in the district of Segeberg, in Schleswig-Holstein, Germany. It is situated approximately 40 km northeast of Hamburg, and 9 km southwest of Bad Segeberg.

Leezen is the seat of the Amt ("collective municipality") Leezen.

References

Segeberg